Wheelchair rugby league is a wheelchair-based version of rugby league football, one of two recognised disability versions of the sport. It was developed by French rugby league player, coach and official, Wally Salvan in 2004. Unlike other wheelchair sports, people without disabilities are allowed to compete in top-level competition. The sport is also unique in the fact that men and women of any age can play against each other in top-level competition.

Rules
The game shares many features with the regular rugby league:

Use of a size 4 rugby ball
Ball may only be passed backwards
Each team retains possession for six tackles, after which there is a hand-over
A modified version of the play-the-ball is used after a tackle
Same offside rules as rugby league
The 2006 rules

The game then sees its own particular rules:

All kicks – penalties, drop outs and conversions – are taken with the fist
Matches are generally played on a handball court with dimensions of 40×20 metres
Indoor rugby posts are put in place for conversions, drop kicks and penalty kicks
 In professional competition a maximum of two 'able bodied' players are allowed on the pitch per team

Clubs

France
As with the 'running' variant of the sport, most of the French wheelchair rugby league teams are situated in the south of the country.

 Catalans Dragons

United Kingdom
The British domestic league is one of the more established in the world with over twenty teams from across the country taking part. They feature in the Super League, Championship League and then regional development leagues. Teams in Britain include:
 Bedford Tigers
 Bradford Bulls
 Celts
 Dundee Dragons
 EBBW Vale
 Gravesend Dynamite
 Halifax Panthers
 Hereford Harriers
 Hull FC
 Leeds Rhinos
 Leyland Warriors
 Medway Dragons
 Mersey Storm
 Newcastle Thunder
 North Wales Crusaders
 Rochdale Hornets
 Sheffield Eagles
 St Helens
 Swindon St. George
 Wakefield Trinity
 Warrington Wolves
 West Wales Raiders
 Wigan Warriors
 Woodland Warriors

International Competitions

World Cup

The inaugural Wheelchair Rugby League World Cup was held at indoor venues in Sydney, Australia in 2008. The 2013 Wheelchair RL World Cup was held in Gillingham, England in July. It saw a tightly fought game with big collisions culminate in a victory for France. The 2017 World Cup was held in the south of France in July. The holders, France, triumphed over a strong England side in another tightly fought contest.

The 2021 World Cup (played in 2022 due to the COVID-19 pandemic) took place in England with 8 teams, England, Wales, Scotland, Ireland, France, Spain, USA and Australia. For the USA this was to be their first major tournament. England defeated France 28-24 in the final in Manchester with an attendance of just under 5000. Also, in a world first all matches were broadcast by the BBC.

The next World Cup will be in France as part of the 2025 Rugby League World Cup.

World Cup summaries

European Championship

The Wheelchair Rugby League European Championship was first held in 2015 as a one off tournament. It is expected to occur every four years from 2023.

European Championship summaries

Celtic Cup

The Celtic Cup has been held annually since 2015 and features the three Celtic nations of the British Isles – Ireland, Scotland, and Wales.

Titles
 Ireland: 1
 Scotland: 0
 Wales: 6

Domestic Competitions

 RFL
 Wheelchair Super League
 Wheelchair Challenge Cup

See also
 IRL Wheelchair World Rankings
 Wheelchair sports
 Wheelchair rugby
 Wheelchair Australian rules football

References

External links
 RFL page on Wheelchair rugby league
 Boots'N'All feature on Wheelchair rugby league
 English Federation of Disabled Sport
 RL Festival of World Cups 2013

Variations of rugby league
Sports originating in France